is a co-educational public senior high school in Takaichi District, Nara, Japan.

The school provides three courses; English, International Communication, and a general course.

Clubs 
The school has 23 total clubs. There are 14 cultural clubs and 9 athletic clubs.

Cultural Clubs 
 Brass band
 School newspaper
 School broadcasting
 Tea ceremony
 Flower arrangement
 Calligraphy
 Koto
 Fine arts
 Literary
 Drama
 English speaking society
 Volunteer
 Human rights thinking
 Karuta

Athletic Clubs 
 Basketball
 Volleyball
 Soccer
 Tennis
 Table tennis
 Kendo
 Track and field
 Baseball

External links

1984 establishments in Japan
Schools in Nara Prefecture
Educational institutions established in 1984
High schools in Nara Prefecture